Mizumoto (written: 水本) is a Japanese surname. Notable people with the surname include:

, Japanese footballer
, Japanese footballer
Tetsuya Mizumoto, Japanese engineer
, Japanese swimmer

See also
, a park in Katsushika ward, Tokyo, Japan

Japanese-language surnames